The Long Way Home is the second full-length studio album by Australian metalcore band Confession, released on 23 September 2011, through Resist Records. This is the last album to feature guitarists Dan Brown and Adam Harris, bassist Tim Anderson and drummer Shane O'Brien, leaving Michael Crafter as the only original member.

The album was recorded with famed Swedish producer Fredrik Nordström (In Flames, Bring Me the Horizon, At the Gates, Opeth) at his Studio Fredman in Gothenburg, Sweden, in April 2011.

Track listing

Personnel
 Michael Crafter – lead vocals
 Dan Brown – guitar, clean vocals
 Adam Harris – guitar
 Tim Anderson – bass
 Shane O'Brien – drums, percussion

Charts

References

Confession (band) albums
2011 albums
Resist Records albums